In boxing and some other sports, a southpaw stance is where the boxer has the right hand and the right foot forward, leading with right jabs, and following with a left cross right hook. It is the normal stance for a left-handed boxer. The corresponding boxing designation for a right-handed boxer is the orthodox stance, which is generally a mirror-image of the southpaw stance. In American English, "southpaw" generally refers to a person who is left-handed.

Strategy
Left-handed boxers are usually taught to fight in a southpaw stance, but right-handed fighters can also fight in the southpaw stance for many reasons such as tricking the opponent into a false sense of safety. Fighting in a southpaw stance is believed to give the fighter a strategic advantage because of the tactical and cognitive difficulties of coping with a fighter who moves in a mirror-reverse of the norm. Left-handed fighters are often taught to fight in orthodox stance despite their dominant side being their left, either because of the overriding need to best counter a fighter who uses an orthodox stance, or because of the (real or perceived) limited number of trainers who specialize in training the southpaw stance. Moreover, the southpaw stance may leave fighters more vulnerable to blows to the liver.

A skilled right-hander, such as Roy Jones Jr. or Terence Crawford, may switch to the left-handed (southpaw) stance to take advantage of the fact that most fighters lack experience against lefties. In addition, a right-hander in southpaw with a powerful left cross obtains an explosively different combination. The converted southpaw may use a right jab followed by a left cross, with the intention of making opponents slip to the outside of their left side. Then the converted right-hander can simply turn one's body left and face the opponent, placing the opponent in orthodox, and follow up with an unexpected right cross. If the southpaw fighter is right-hand dominant with a strong left cross, this puts the opponent in danger of knockout from each punch in the combination, as jabs with the power hand can stun or knock out (KO) in heavier weight classes.
 
While rare, the reverse is also true for left-handers; left-hand dominant fighters like Oscar De La Hoya and Miguel Cotto who fight from an orthodox stance give up the so-called "southpaw advantage" strategically, but are gifted with heavier lead hands. Consequently, in MMA if one stands in a southpaw stance (strongside forward), one must train one's cross and left low kick to make them fast, hard and dangerous.

While rare, cross-dominant MMA fighters and kickboxers could also benefit from fighting from a southpaw stance.

Previous uses of the term southpaw
The "American Heritage Dictionary of the English Language" cites the conventional wisdom that the word "southpaw" originated "from the practice in baseball of arranging the diamond with the batter facing east to avoid the afternoon sun." Though many claim that the term originated due to the orientation of baseball playing fields in order to keep the sun out of the players' eyes and the resulting alignment of a left-handed pitcher's throwing arm causing the pitcher to have his left hand on the south side of his body, the term had been used decades prior to that to indicate "not-usual".

Notable southpaw fighters
Boxing
 Manny Pacquiao 
 Oleksandr Usyk
 Karl Mildenberger
 Vasyl Lomachenko 
 Edwin Valero 
 Marvelous Marvin Hagler
 Héctor Camacho
 William 'Bendigo' Thompson
 Pernell Whitaker
 Joe Calzaghe
 Vicente Saldívar
 Tiger Flowers
 Young Corbett III
 Gabriel Elorde
 Sergio Martínez
 Iván Calderón
 Freddie Miller
 Sultan Ibragimov
 Naseem Hamed
 Lucian Bute
 Zab Judah
 Gervonta Davis
 Khaosai Galaxy
 Ruslan Chagaev
 Otto Wallin
 Adonis Stevenson
 Shakur Stevenson
 Errol Spence Jr.
Josh Taylor
Ja'Van Nurse Jr.
Muay Thai/Kickboxing/K-1
 Mirko Filipovic
 Saenchai
 Giorgio Petrosyan
 Raymond Daniels
 Petchpanomrung Kiatmookao
 Andrew Tate
MMA
 Dustin Poirier
 Colby Covington
 Dan Severn
 Conor McGregor
 Stephen Thompson
 Luke Rockhold
 Anthony Pettis
 Darren Till
 Nick Diaz
 Nate Diaz
 Anderson Silva
 Holly Holm
 Robbie Lawler
 Matt Mitrione
 Vitor Belfort
 Benson Henderson
 Sam Alvey
 Marcus Brimage
 Valentina Shevchenko
 Marvin Vettori
Jeet Kune Do
 Bruce Lee

See also
List of left-handed boxers
Orthodox stance

References

Boxing terminology
Kickboxing terminology
Motor skills